Tanzi is a railway station on the Taiwan Railways Administration West Coast line (Mountain line) located in Tanzi District, Taichung City, Taiwan. The station was once the eastern terminal for the now defunct TRA Shengang line. The current station is located on ground level. As part of the elevatization process of the West Coast line, a new elevated Tanzi Station is currently under construction and will open on 29 March 2016.

Platform Layout

Train services
As a minor station, Tanzi Station is primarily serviced by Local Trains (區間車). A few times per day a Chu-Kuang Express (莒光號) or a Tzu-Chiang Limited Express (自強號) stops at the station.

Around the station
 Zhaixing Villa

References 

1905 establishments in Taiwan
Railway stations in Taichung
Railway stations opened in 1905
Railway stations served by Taiwan Railways Administration